Alisher Village is located in Pathankot tehsil in district Gurdaspur, in the Indian state of Punjab. It is 13 km from the district headquarters in Pathankot. Alisher village is also a Gram panchayat.

Its population is 592 people, of which 332 are males and 620 are females. Its pin code is 143519.

References 

Villages in Gurdaspur district